Laser Physics is a monthly peer-reviewed scientific journal covering research on the physics and technology of lasers and their applications. It is owned and editorially managed by Astro Ltd. and published on their behalf by IOP Publishing. The journal was established in 1990 with Alexander M. Prokhorov as founding editor-in-chief until 2002. The current editor-in-chief is Vanderlei S. Bagnato. It is a sister journal to Laser Physics Letters.

Abstracting and indexing
The journal is  abstracted and indexed in:
Science Citation Index Expanded
Current Contents
Scopus
INSPEC

History
The journal was published by MAIK Nauka/Interperiodica from 1991 to 2005, by Springer Science+Business Media from 2006 to 2012, and since then by IOP Publishing. Its sister journal, Laser Physics Letters, was established in 2004.

See also
Laser

External links

Optics journals
IOP Publishing academic journals
Laser science
Monthly journals
Publications established in 1990
English-language journals